Travis Richard Jervey (born May 5, 1972) is a former American football running back. He played for the Green Bay Packers, San Francisco 49ers, and Atlanta Falcons of the National Football League (NFL). With the Packers, he won Super Bowl XXXI over the New England Patriots and participated in the 1998 Pro Bowl.

Football career

Early years
Jervey attended Wando High School in Mount Pleasant, South Carolina and played collegiately at The Citadel in neighboring Charleston, where he was the backup to Everette Sands for three years. Jervey also considered playing for Hawaii, but that program only offered him a partial scholarship. During his senior season, Jervey set a school record with a 96 yard run against VMI in the Oyster Bowl. Jervey was later inducted into both The Citadel and South Carolina Athletic Hall of Fame.

Professional career

Green Bay Packers
Jervey was a 5th round pick (170th overall) of the Packers in the 1995 NFL Draft; lead scout John Dorsey suggested taking Terrell Davis with the pick but general manager Ron Wolf was worried about Davis' injury history and took Jervey instead. In the 1996 season, Jervey participated in the "NFL's Fastest Man" competition and placed fourth. After playing exclusively at running back in college, Jervey began playing on special teams with the Packers and made the 1998 Pro Bowl as a special teams player. In 1998, Jervey started five games in place of the injured Dorsey Levens before sustaining a broken ankle. As his rookie contract was up after 1998, the Jacksonville Jaguars originally offered Jervey a three-year contract but later rescinded; he re-signed on a one-year deal with the Packers.

San Francisco 49ers
In 1999, he signed a four-year free agent contract with the 49ers worth $6 million. While still recovering from a broken ankle, Jervey claimed to take testosterone shots, but the league said Jervey took steroids and suspended him for four games. In the 2000 season, Jervey returned kicks for the 49ers, but his season came to an early end after he suffered a broken collarbone against the St. Louis Rams. After reportedly taking a pay cut prior to the 1999 season, Jervey would not negotiate a lower level of compensation for the 2000 season and was released on March 19 in what was viewed as a move to save salary cap space.

Atlanta Falcons
Jervey signed with the Atlanta Falcons on May 1, 2001. He played in every game that year, mostly on special teams. He was re-signed for the 2002 season, but a torn anterior cruciate ligament ended his season in late October. His 2003 season with the Falcons was derailed by a neck sprain sustained late in the season.

Personal life
While playing for the Packers, Jervey lived with teammate LeShon Johnson in Green Bay, Wisconsin. The two owned a pet lion named Nala after previously being dissuaded from owning a monkey. He was arrested for speeding in his Ferrari  and marijuana possession in February 1998, but the marijuana charges were later dropped when it was determined that law enforcement misidentified a substance in his car. Jervey is married. He is an avid surfer, and previously held land in Dominical, Puntarenas when he wintered in Costa Rica to ride waves.

Jervey returned to football in a one-off coaching appearance for the American team in the 2015 Medal of Honor Bowl.

Notes

1972 births
Living people
Players of American football from Columbia, South Carolina
American football running backs
The Citadel Bulldogs football players
Green Bay Packers players
San Francisco 49ers players
Atlanta Falcons players
National Conference Pro Bowl players